Sherwin Kenneth "Sonny" Gandee, Sr. (February 27, 1929 – July 21, 2013) was a professional American football linebacker and defensive lineman. After playing college football for Ohio State, Gandee was drafted by the Detroit Lions in 1952 NFL Draft. He played for five seasons in the National Football League (NFL) for the Dallas Texans in two games during the 1952 season and for the Detroit Lions in 51 games from 1952 to 1957.  He was a member of the Lions' 1952, 1953 and 1957 teams that won NFL championships.

Early years
Gandee was born in 1929 in Akron, Ohio, and attended that city's Garfield High School. His father, Sherman Gandee, was a deputy sheriff in Summit County, Ohio. He had a twin brother, Sherman "Joe" Gandee, Jr.

College football
Gandee attended Ohio State University and played college football as an end for the Ohio State Buckeyes football team in 1948, 1950, and 1951. He missed the 1949 season after sustaining a chipped vertebrae in his neck during a pre-season scrimmage. At the end of his senior season, he was selected to play in the 1951 East–West Shrine Game. He also played in the 1952 Senior Bowl.

Professional football
Gandee was selected by the Detroit Lions in the ninth round (106th overall) of the 1952 NFL Draft. He appeared in two games for the Dallas Texans and eight games for the Lions during the 1952 season. He remained with the Lions through the 1956 season and played on the club's NFL championship teams in 1952 and 1953.

Family and later years
Gandee and his wife, Marilyn [Grecni] Gandee were married in 1949. they had a son and a daughter. After his first wife died in 2008, he was remarried to Jo Burgett-Amo.

After retiring from football, Gandee operated a restaurant in Wyandotte, Michigan, known as "Sonny Grandee's Celebrity House". He also worked in the automotive industry. He lived in Wyandotte for over 50 years and later lived in Gibraltar and Grosse Ile, Michigan.

Gandee died in 2013 in Grosse Ile at age 84.

References

1929 births
2013 deaths
American football defensive linemen
American football linebackers
Dallas Texans (NFL) players
Detroit Lions players
Ohio State Buckeyes football players
Players of American football from Akron, Ohio
People from Grosse Ile, Michigan
People from Wyandotte, Michigan